Whistle Lake is a small lake located within city limits in Anacortes Community Forest Lands southeast of central Anacortes, Washington. Though not directly accessible by vehicle, Whistle Lake attracts thousands of visitors each year.  The lake may be reached by driving to the trailhead off Whistle Lake Road and hiking 1.3 miles.

The scenery surrounding the lake is pleasant and a variety of trails provide opportunities for hikers.  The lake itself is used for swimming and fishing; only inflatable rafts and non-motorized boats can be used. Cliffs varying in height from 10 feet to nearly 70 feet attract cliff divers.

References

Lakes of Washington (state)
Lakes of Skagit County, Washington
Protected areas of Skagit County, Washington